Eliseu Martins Ramalho (born 10 April 1952 in Leça da Palmeira, Matosinhos), simply Eliseu, is a retired Portuguese footballer who played as a midfielder.

External links

1952 births
Living people
Portuguese footballers
Association football midfielders
Primeira Liga players
Leça F.C. players
Leixões S.C. players
Varzim S.C. players
Boavista F.C. players
Portugal international footballers
Sportspeople from Matosinhos